House of Pleasure (German: Frau Wirtin hat auch eine Nichte, Italian: Il trionfo della casta Susanna) is a 1969 historical comedy film directed by Franz Antel and starring Teri Tordai, Claudio Brook and Margaret Lee. It is the third in the series of films which began with The Sweet Sins of Sexy Susan (1967).

Cast
 Teri Tordai as Wirtin von der Lahn / Sexy Susan / Susanne Delberg 
 Claudio Brook as Baron von Ambras 
 Margaret Lee as Pauline Borghese 
 Karl Michael Vogler as Prince Borghese 
 Harald Leipnitz as Ferdinand 
 Jacques Herlin as Ambassador Bulakieff 
 Heinrich Schweiger as Napoleon Bonaparte
 Ralf Wolter as Waltchmaker Bobinet 
 Lando Buzzanca as Conte Lombardini 
 Edwige Fenech as Rosalie Bobinet 
 Rosemarie Lindt as Bertha 
 Judith Dornys as Dorine 
 Grit Freyberg
 Sissy Löwinger as Serafine 
 Annamária Szilvássy as Agathe 
 Erich Nikowitz as Waldeshain 
 Franz Muxeneder as Pumpernickel 
Erich Padalewski as Officer 
 Guido Wieland
 Éva Vadnai as Babushka 
 György Máday as Fuchsel
 Eva Vodickova as Denise

References

Bibliography 
 Robert Von Dassanowsky. Austrian Cinema: A History. McFarland, 2005.

External links 
 
 House of Pleasure at Variety Distribution

1969 films
1960s historical comedy films
1960s sex comedy films
German historical comedy films
Austrian historical comedy films
Hungarian historical comedy films
Italian historical comedy films
German sex comedy films
Commedia sexy all'italiana
West German films
1960s German-language films
Films directed by Franz Antel
Films scored by Gianni Ferrio
Films set in the 1800s
Depictions of Napoleon on film
Constantin Film films
Austrian sex comedy films
1960s German films
1960s Italian films